Hexagon Comics is a syndicate of French, Italian and Spanish comic book writers and artists formed in early 2004, after French publisher Semic Comics decided to cancel its line of comic books.

Taking advantage of European copyright laws, these writers and artists got together, reclaimed the rights to the more than 300 characters they had created for Editions Lug, Semic Comics' predecessor, and reorganized under the banner of Hexagon Comics. Among these are Zembla, Jed Puma, Drago, Dragut, Rakar, Baroud, Wampus, Jaleb, Jaydee, Homicron, Brigade Temporelle, C.L.A.S.H., Sibilla, Phenix, Starlock, Kabur, Waki, etc.

Books published by Hexagon Comics in English

Since 2006, Hexagon Comics has been releasing a number of books in English through its affiliated company, Black Coat Press:

 Wampus (2006) 
 C.L.A.S.H. (2006)  
 Phenix (2006) 
 Kabur (2006) 
 Zembla (2007) 
 Strangers Origins: Homicron (2008) 
 Strangers Origins: Jaydee (2009) 
 Strangers Origins: Starlock (2009) 
 Hexagon: Dark Matter (prose novel) (2013) 
 Guardian of the Republic #1 (2014) 
 Strangers 1: Strangers in a Strange Land (2014) 
 Strangers 0: Omens & Origins (2015) 
 Bob Lance 1: The Round Table
 Bob Lance 2: To Seek the Holy Grail
 Bob Lance 3: The Ghost of Rasputin
 Tales of the Twilight People: Dr. Despair
 The Time Brigade: The Grail Wars
 Tiger & The Eye

Books published by Hexagon Comics in French

In France, starting in May 2010, Hexagon Comics launched a series of monthly, 500-plus-page trade paperbacks reprinting classic stories from its library, as well as launching three 48-page comic-book series:  Strangers, Strangers Universe and Le Garde Républicain.

Trade paperback reprints of classic stories

 Wampus (Tome 1) 
 Wampus (Tome 2) 
 Strangers: Homicron/Jayde (Tome 1) 
 Strangers: Starlock/Jaleb (Tome 2) 
 Strangers: Tanka/CLASH (Tome 3) 
 Strangers: Jaleb (Tome 4) 
 Phénix (Tome 1) 
 Phénix à Paris (Tome 2) 
 Hexagon (Tome 1) 
 Hexagon (Tome 2) 
 Hexagon (Tome 3) 
 La Saga de Kabur 
 Brigade Temporelle (Tome 1) 
 Brigade Temporelle (Tome 2) 
  Les Exploits de Dragut 
 Kit Kappa 
 Comte de Saint-Germain 
 Ozark 
 Zembla (Tome 1) 
 Les Rois des Profondeurs (Tome 1) 
 Les Rois des Profondeurs (Tome 2) 
 Kidz (Tome 1) 
 Kidz (Tome 2) 
 Kidz (Tome 3) 
 Kidz (Tome 4) 
 Galaor 
 Ben Léonard 
 Frank Universal du Wold Safety Unit 
 Chevaliers de l'Espace 
 L'Etoile à 5 Branches 
 Lucifer 
 Gallix 
 Dick Demon - Stormalong 
 Le Gladiateur de Bronze 
 Agence Thunderbolt 
 Zembla (Tome 2) 
 Larry Cannon 
 Sergent Cannon 
 Jed Puma 
 Baroud 
 Drago 
 Bob Lance (Tome 1) 
 Bob Lance (Tome 2) 
 Bob Lance (Tome 3) 
 Gun Gallon 
 Zembla (Tome 3) 
 Afrikanders 
 Le Chat
 Dick Spade / Dave Kaplan
 Champagne
 L'Epervier
 Ricky Rox
 X-101
 Corsak
 Apollon
 Jean Brume
 Le Prince de la Nuit
 Zembla Tome 4
 Billy Boyd
 Rakar
 Galton & Trumbo
 Lone Bardo
 Brigade As
 Viking
 Zapo 
 Flag des Neiges
 Utopie
 Johnny Bourask Tome 1
 Johnny Bourask Tome 2
 Johnny Bourask Tome 3
 Zembla Tome 5
 Gun Gallon Tome 2
 Ivan Karine
 Bill & Barry
 Jacky West
 Jed Puma Tome 2
 Luc le Clandestin
 Capitaine Tiger
 Gun Gallon Tome 3
 Tocard Gang Tome 1
 Tocard Gang Tome 2
 Zembla Tome 6
 Baroud Tome 2
 Drago Tome 2
 Waki
 Gun Gallon Tome 4
 Gun Gallon Tome 5
 Flambo * Tirtouche Tome 1
 Flambo * Tirtouche Tome 2

Color Reprints of modern-day stories

 Dick Demon: Point de Chute (hardcover) 
 Kabur: L'Etoile Rouge (hardcover) 
 Strangers 0: Presages & Prologues (tpb) 
 Strangers 1: Etrangers en Terre Etrangere (tpb) 
 Strangers 2: Des Dieux et des Hommes (tpb) 
 Dragut: Bouche Rouge

Comic-books

Le Garde Republicain (color)

 #1 
 #2-A  
 #2-B 
 Les Partisans (b&w)  
 #3-A 
 #3-B  
 Special Noel 2014-A (b&w)  (with Le Prince de la Nuit) 
 Special Noel 2014-B (b&w) (with Kit Kappa)  
 #4-A  
 #4-B 
 #5-A  
 #5-B 
 Special Noel 2015 (b&w) (with Dragut, Bouche Rouge, Brigade Temporelle)
 #6-A  
 #6-B 
 #7-A  
 #7-B 
 Special Noel 2016 (b&w) (with Hexagon)
 #8-A 
 #8-B 
 #9-A 
 #9-B 
 #10-A 
 #10-B 
 Special Noel 2017 (b&w) (with Comte de Saint-Germain)
 Special Vacances 2018 (b&w) (with Phénix, Super-Patriotes)

Strangers Saison 3 (b&w)

 #1 
 #2  
 #3 
 #4 
 #5 
 #6 
 #7 
 #8 
 #9 
 #10 
 #11 
 #12
 #13
 #14
 #15
 #16
 #17
 #18

Strangers Saison 4 (b&w)

 #1 
 #2  
 #3 
 #4 
 #5 
 #6 
 #7 
 #8

Strangers Saison 5 (b&w)

 #1 
 #2 
 #3 
 #4 
 #5 
 #6 
 #7 
 #8 
 #9 
 #10 
 #11
 #12
 #13
 #14

Strangers Universe (color)

 #1 Zembla/Kabur (Tome 1) 
 #2 Zembla/Kabur (Tome 2) 
 #3 Starlock/Homicron 
 #4 Galaor/Futura 
 #5 Garde Republicain/Jean Brume 
 #6 Gladiateur de Bronze
 #7 Brigade Temporelle
 #8 Phénix

Les Nouvelles Aventures de Zembla (b&w)

 #1 
 #2 
 #3

Misc. (b&w)

 Hexagon: La Ruche Noire 
  Scarlet Lips: Crimson Dawn 
 Le Dossier Homicron
 Kidz: Origions

Prose books

 Hexagon 1: Matiere Noire (novel)  
 Dimension Super-Heros (Tome 1) (anthology) 
 Hexagon 2: La Guerre des Immortels (novel)  
 Dimension Super-Heros (Tome 2) (anthology) 
 Sibilla: Cercles Mortels
 Barry Barrison et L'Héritage de Tarford Castle
 Dimension Super-Heros (Tome 3)

Other Languages

There are also Italian, Spanish and Turkish-language editions of some of the Hexagon Comics titles.

External links
 Hexagon Comics official website Contains detailed character bios and articles on history of Editions Lug and Semic Comics.
 Black Coat Press
 French-language reprints

 
Comic book publishing companies of the United States